Raoult may refer to:

Raoult's law on vapor-liquid equilibrium
People:
François-Marie Raoult (1830 – 1901), chemist after whom Raoult's law is named
Annie Raoult (born 1951), French applied mathematician
Didier Raoult, French biologist, who identified Mimivirus
Éric Raoult, French politician
Places:
Manneville-la-Raoult, town in northern France
Le Mesnil-Raoult, town in north-western France

French-language surnames